Alireza Korangy Isfahani is an Iranian-American literary critic, philologist and linguist. He is currently faculty at the American University of Beirut. He was previously an Assistant Professor at the University of Virginia. Korangy also taught at the University of Colorado at Boulder.
He is the editor-in-chief of the International Journal of Persian Literature and is known for his works on Persian poetry.

Career
Korangy is interested in classical Persian and Arabic philology with a focus on poetics, rhetoric, and linguistics. In his 2013 book, Development of the Ghazal and Khāqānī's Contribution, Korangy provides a detailed commentary on Khāqānī and his status in Persian ghazal development. Rebecca Gould admires Korangy's genealogy of Khāqānī and believes it is the most thorough genealogy of the poet's influences in any language.
Ali-Asghar Seyed-Gohrab calls Kroangy's book on Khāqānī "a valuable monograph" in which the author provides an account of the origins, developments and characteristics of sabk-e Khorasani, an early Persian poetic style.
Korangy is also the editor of several volumes on Islamic/Iranian philosophy, literature and linguistics, among them is a festschrift of Ahmad Mahdavi Damghani titled Essays in Islamic Philology, History, and Philosophy.

Books
 Development of the Ghazal and Khāqānī's Contribution, with a foreword by Wolfhart P. Heinrichs, Wiesbaden: Harrassowitz Verlag 2013, ISBN 9783447069557
 Kurdish Art and Identity (ed.), preface by Philip G. Kreyenbroek, De Gruyter 2020
 Persian Linguistics in Cultural Contexts, co-editor with Farzad Sharifian, Routledge 2020
 Essays on Typology of Iranian Languages, co-editor with Behrooz Mahmoodi-Bakhtiari, De Gruyter 2019
The Beloved in Middle Eastern Literatures: The Culture of Love and Languishing. co-editor with Hanadi Al-Samman & Michael Beard, London: I.B. Tauris, 2017
Essays in Islamic Philology, History, and Philosophy, co-editor with Wheeler M. Thackston, Roy P. Mottahedeh and William Granara, De Gruyter 2016
 Urdu and Indo-Persian Thought, Poetics, and Belles Lettres (ed.), Brill 2017
 Trends in Iranian and Persian Linguistics, co-editor with Corey Miller, De Gruyter Mouton 2018
 The 'Other' Martyrs: Women and the Poetics of Sexuality, Sacrifice, and Death in World Literatures, co-editor with Leyla Rouhi, Harrassowitz Verlag 2019
 No Tapping around Philology: A Festschrift in Honor of Wheeler McIntosh Thackston Jr.'s 70th Birthday, co-editor with Daniel J Sheffield, Harrassowitz Verlag 2014

References

Living people
Harvard University alumni
University of Virginia faculty
Date of birth missing (living people)
American people of Iranian descent
Iranian literary critics
American literary critics
University of Colorado Boulder faculty
Year of birth missing (living people)